Mianki Banda is a town and union council of Karak District in Khyber Pakhtunkhwa province of Pakistan. It is located at 32°55'60N 71°1'0E at an altitude of 447 metres (1469 feet) and forms a part of Takht-e-Nasrati Tehsil.

References

Union councils of Karak District
Populated places in Karak District
Karak District